Hubert Thomas Wiggs (September 29, 1893 – October 18, 1977) was a professional American football player and coach who played offensive lineman for three seasons for the Louisville Brecks. He played college football for the Vanderbilt Commodores where he was a fullback on the "point-a-minute" 1915 team.

References

1893 births
1977 deaths
People from Tullahoma, Tennessee
American football offensive linemen
Louisville Brecks players
Vanderbilt Commodores football players
Louisville Brecks and Colonels (NFL) coaches
American football fullbacks
All-Southern college football players
Players of American football from Tennessee